Abdoulaye Seck (born 4 June 1992) is a Senegalese professional footballer who plays as a centre-back for Israeli Premier League club Maccabi Haifa and the Senegal national team.

Career statistics

Honours
Royal Antwerp
Belgian Cup: 2019–20

Senegal
Africa Cup of Nations: 2021

References

1992 births
Living people
Senegalese footballers
Association football defenders
Senegal international footballers
Africa Cup of Nations-winning players
Stade de Mbour players
Mbour Petite-Côte FC players
Casa Sports players
Diambars FC players
Hønefoss BK players
Sandefjord Fotball players
Royal Antwerp F.C. players
Maccabi Haifa F.C. players
Eliteserien players
Norwegian First Division players
Belgian Pro League players
Israeli Premier League players
2021 Africa Cup of Nations players
Senegalese expatriate footballers
Expatriate footballers in Norway
Expatriate footballers in Belgium
Expatriate footballers in Israel
Senegalese expatriate sportspeople in Norway
Senegalese expatriate sportspeople in Belgium
Senegalese expatriate sportspeople in Israel